Sonya Jeyaseelan (born April 24, 1976) is a Canadian former professional tennis player.

Her highest WTA singles ranking is No. 48, which she reached in December 2000. Her career-high ranking in doubles is world No. 40, achieved on 16 October 2000.

Playing for Canada in Fed Cup, Jeyaseelan has a win–loss record of 29–7.

WTA career finals

Singles: 1 (runner-up)

Doubles: 3 (2 titles, 1 runner-up)

ITF Circuit finals

Singles: 5 (3–2)

Doubles: 5 (3–2)

External links
 
 
 

1976 births
Living people
Canadian female tennis players
Canadian people of Tamil descent
Olympic tennis players of Canada
Racket sportspeople from British Columbia
Sportspeople from New Westminster
Tennis players at the 2000 Summer Olympics
Tennis players from Toronto
20th-century Canadian women
21st-century Canadian women